Not Fakin' It is the second studio album by Hanoi Rocks singer Michael Monroe, released in September 1989 through PolyGram; a remastered edition was reissued through Lemon Recordings in 2003. The album is Monroe's most commercially successful solo release to date, reaching No. 14 on the Finnish albums chart, No. 161 on the U.S. Billboard 200, and being certified gold in Japan.

The music video for "Dead, Jail or Rock 'n' Roll" featured Guns N' Roses singer Axl Rose and received substantial rotation on MTV; it was later covered by the band Warrant for their 2002 album Under the Influence. The track "Angel" is a re-recording of the song "She's No Angel" which had appeared on Monroe's previous album, Nights Are So Long (1987).

Musical style
The albums consists of "Michael Monroe [adding] hair band rock to his usual mix of punk, glam, and '70s heavy metal". Ultimate Classic Rock placed the album No. 26 on their list of the Top 30 Glam Metal Albums, and described it as a "glam-punk-'n'-roll hybrid".

Track listing

Personnel

Michael Monroe – lead vocals, harmonica, shaker, arrangement (tracks 1, 3–10), producer (tracks 1–3, 9)
Phil Grande – lead and rhythm guitar (all tracks), arrangement (tracks 4, 6, 7, 10)
Nasty Suicide – guitar (tracks 1–3)
Jimmy Ripp – guitar (tracks 1–3, 9), slide guitar (track 1)
Ed Roynesdal – keyboard, piano (tracks 5, 6)
Ian Hunter – piano (track 3)
Anton Fig – drums (tracks 1–3, 9)
Thommy Price – drums (tracks 4–8, 10)
Sue Hadjopoulos – percussion (tracks 1, 4, 6–10), tambourine (track 2)
John Regan – bass (tracks 1–3)
Kenny Aaronson – bass (tracks 4–10)
Mark Rivera – saxophone
Little Steven – backing vocals (tracks 1–3, 5), arrangement (tracks 2, 5, 6, 9)
Suha Gur – background vocals (track 1)
Dave Hansen – background vocals (track 1)
Stephen Innocenzi – background vocals (track 1)
Brian Sperber – background vocals (track 1), engineering assistance
Holly Beth Vincent – background vocals (track 2)
Kim Lesley – background vocals (tracks 4, 6, 9, 10)
Nicole Hart – background vocals (tracks 4, 6, 9, 10)
Gennaro – background vocals (tracks 4, 6, 9, 10)
The Monroettes – background vocals (tracks 7, 8)
Brian James – arrangement (track 3)
Martin Briley – arrangement (track 8)

Technical
Michael Frondelli – engineering, mixing, production
Will Garrett – engineering
Rod O'Brien – engineering (tracks 1–3, 9)
Ellen Fitton – engineering assistance 
Billy Miranda – engineering assistance (tracks 1–3, 9)
George Marino – mastering
Frankie "Teardrop" Miles – production assistance
John Scarpati - cover photography

Chart performance

References

Michael Monroe albums
1989 albums
PolyGram albums